The Opposition House Leader, officially known as Leader of the Official Opposition in the House of Commons of Canada, is a member of the Official Opposition, not to be confused with the Leader of the Official Opposition, but is generally a senior member of the frontbench. The House Leader is responsible for questioning the Government House Leader on the forthcoming business of the House of Commons, negotiating with the Government House Leader and other parties' house leaders on the progress of business in the House, and managing the Official Opposition's business in the House of Commons.

The position of Opposition House Leader evolved in the 1950s as each Opposition party began to designate a particular MP to question the  Government House Leader on upcoming House business. The title of Opposition House Leader became official in 1963, and in 1974, a special annual indemnity was attached to the position of House Leader in each of the opposition parties. The House Leader also coordinates the Official Opposition's floor strategy, often with the House Leaders of smaller opposition parties. The position is particularly important when there is a minority government, or a government with a slim majority, which may be defeated by a vote of no confidence if all opposition parties work together.

Notable Opposition House Leaders include Herb Gray of the Liberal Party (also a Government House Leader) and Erik Nielsen of the Progressive Conservative Party.

Notable third party House Leaders include Stanley Knowles who was the House Leader for the NDP from 1962 to 1981, and Bill Blaikie (1996–2003).

List of Official Opposition House Leaders

List of official third party House Leaders

New Democratic Party
Stanley Knowles 1962–1984
Ian Deans 1984–1986 (acting 1981–1984)
Nelson Riis 1986–1994
Len Taylor 1994–1996
Bill Blaikie 1996–2003
Libby Davies 2003–2011
Official Opposition 2011–2015
Peter Julian 2015–2016
Murray Rankin 2016–2018
Ruth Ellen Brosseau 2018–2019
Peter Julian 2019–present

Reform Party
Elwin Hermanson 1993–1995
Raymond Speaker 1995–1997
Official Opposition after 1997

Progressive Conservative Party
Government or Official Opposition before 1993
None 1993–1997
Peter MacKay 1997–2002 
Loyola Hearn 2002–2004

Bloc Quebecois
Official Opposition 1993–1997
Michel Gauthier 1997–2007
Pierre Paquette 2007–2011
Louis Plamondon 2011–2013 
André Bellavance 2013–2014 
Jean-François Fortin 2014  
Louis Plamondon 2014–2015
Luc Thériault 2015–2019
Alain Therrien 2019–present

See also
 Speaker of the House of Commons (Canada)
 Leader of the Government in the House of Commons (Canada)
 Leader of the Official Opposition (Canada)
 Leader of the Opposition in the Senate (Canada)
 Shadow Leader of the House of Commons

References

Politics of Canada
Provincial and territorial ministers in Canada
House of Commons of Canada